Don Bosco is a Mexican telenovela produced by Televisa and transmitted by Telesistema Mexicano.

Cast 
Rafael Bertrand
Alicia Montoya
Nicolás Rodríguez
Alberto Galán
Josefina Escobedo
Antonio Passy
Pepito Morán
Luis Gimeno
Roberto Araya
Armando Gutierrez

Mexican telenovelas
1961 telenovelas
Televisa telenovelas
1961 Mexican television series debuts
1961 Mexican television series endings
Spanish-language telenovelas